The Jewish Museum of Thessaloniki is a museum in Thessaloniki, Central Macedonia, Greece presenting the history of Sephardic Jews and Jewish life in Thessaloniki.

It is also known as: "Museum of Jewish Presence in Thessaloniki", "Jewish History Museum", .

The museum is being run by the Jewish Community of Thessaloniki.

History
The museum is located on 13 Agiou Mina Street. The museum was opened on May 13, 2001, by Evangelos Venizelos, then the Minister of Culture and Andreas Sefiha, the president of the Jewish Community of Thessaloniki. It was Sefiha who had the idea of establishing the museum and started working towards it in 1994. The collection of the museum was based on the documents, ritual objects, and photographic collections as well as the library that used to be housed at Vasileos Herakleiou 26, and was known as "The Center of the Course of Jewish history, in Thessaloniki" or "Center for the Jewish Studies of Thessaloniki" or "Jewish History Centre of Thessaloniki".

In 2019, the museum opened a new wing which added four additional spaces. This included the addition of a museum shop and information on Jewish architecture and Jewish history during the interwar years. The then-president of Greece, Prokopios Pavlopoulos, attended the inauguration of the new wing.

Building
The building was built in 1904 by the Italian architect, Vitaliano Poselli. It housed the Bank of Athens from 1906 to 1925, then later the L'Independent, a Jewish newspaper that ran from 1909 to 1941. The restoration of the building lasted from 1998 to 2003 and was funded by the "Organisation for the Cultural Capital of Europe Thessaloniki 1997". In 2019 the museum was expanded with a new wing that included a shop, new accessible entrance, and exhibition spaces designed by architects Elias Messinas and KARD Architects - Dimitris Raidis and Alexandros Kouloukouris. With the new expansion of the museum, two buildings—the townhouse and the new wing—were attached by arches on their facade to connect as a single portico.

Collections

The museum maintains a number of collections: Tombstones from the destroyed Jewish Cemetery, building members from synagogues demolished by the German occupation authorities, religious objects, old and rare books in Hebrew, family heirlooms, ketoubot, public and private letters during the WWII, costumes (19th and 20th centuries), fabrics, tablecloths, books and bank deposit booklets (until 1940).

Furthermore, the museum maintains a collection of pre-war family and school photographs. These artefacts were donated by expatriate Jews from Thessaloniki.

On the ground level are monumental stones and inscriptions that were once found in the great Jewish necropolis that lay to the east of the city walls. Accompanying these stones are a series of photographs showing the cemetery and visitors as it was in 1914.

Central to the first floor is a narrative history of the Jewish presence in Thessaloniki from the third century BCE until the Second World War. A separate exhibit focuses on the Shoah, as it affected the Jewish Community of Thessaloniki. The majority of the community - some 49,000 people - were systematically deported to Auschwitz and Bergen-Belsen where most of them perished.

Since 2005, the museum has collected a large number of documents through a special four-year research program. Thanks to the assistance of experienced collectors, such as Mr. Giannis Megas, the Jewish Museum of Thessaloniki today has the most important collection of Thessaloniki business documents, in which, until 1940, Jewish-owned businesses had a dominant position.

A research and documentation center operates within the premises, which aims to document and digitize archival documents from the museum's own collection as well as archival material from other sources, thus creating a database accessible to visitors and researchers. All aforementioned artefacts can currently be accessed via electronic databases.

The museum provides special educational programs for schools.

This gallery shows part of the collection as this was displayed before the museum's establishment in year 2001.

Facts and figures
More than 4000 people visited the museum from September 2009 until June 2010, mainly Jews from around the world, but also researchers who wanted to access the museums archives and library.

The museum is a member of the Association of European Jewish Museums (AEJM).

See also
Holocaust Museum of Greece
History of the Jews of Thessaloniki
History of the Jews in Greece
Jewish Museum of Greece
Jewish Museum of Rhodes

References

External links

Official site
Excerpt of Journal Article by Nicholas Stavroulakis
www.sacred-destinations.com Guide to the museum
www.hri.org Museum of the Jewish Presence in Thessaloniki (Ag. Mina 13) >> Wikimapia shows the museum here
www.hri.org Museum of the Course of Jewish History in Thessaloniki (Vas. Herakleiou 26) >> Wikimapia shows the "Center of Jewish Studies" here
www.hri.org Jewish Community / Cultural
www.sephardicstudies.org
Hellenic Ministry of Culture and Tourism Jewish History Centre of Thessaloniki (24 Tsimiski Street) 

Museums in Thessaloniki
Jewish museums in Greece
Jewish Greek history
Jews and Judaism in Thessaloniki
Cultural infrastructure completed in 1904
Museums established in 2001
Art Nouveau architecture in Greece
Art Nouveau museum buildings
2001 establishments in Greece
History museums in Greece